Nepaldev Bhattacharjee is an Indian politician. He was a Member of Parliament, representing West Bengal in the Rajya Sabha, the upper house of India's Parliament, as a member of the Communist Party of India (Marxist).

References

Rajya Sabha members from West Bengal
Communist Party of India (Marxist)
1950 births
Living people